Conversations with Michael Eisner was a one-hour talk show that ran monthly from March 2006 to April 2009 on CNBC. 

The show was hosted by former Walt Disney Company Chairman and CEO Michael Eisner, who interviewed industry leaders and entertainers. The guests for the first show were businesswoman and television personality Martha Stewart, creative designer and technologist Bran Ferren and British-American businessman and studio head Howard Stringer.

In December 2008, it was announced that the show would be cancelled and this took effect in April 2009.

References

External links
 
 
 Conversations with Michael Eisner on BingeClock

CNBC original programming
2000s American television talk shows
2006 American television series debuts
2009 American television series endings
English-language television shows
Michael Eisner